Medovets is a village in Dalgopol Municipality, in Varna Province, eastern Bulgaria.

References

Villages in Varna Province